The Nottingham prognostic index (NPI) is used to determine prognosis following surgery for breast cancer. Its value is calculated using three pathological criteria: the size of the tumour; the number of involved lymph nodes; and the grade of the tumour. It is calculated to select patients for adjuvant treatment.

Calculation

The index is calculated using the formula:

NPI = [0.2 x S] + N + G

Where:

 S is the size of the index lesion in centimetres
 N is the node status: 0 nodes = 1, 1-3 nodes = 2, >3 nodes = 3
 G is the grade of tumour: Grade I =1, Grade II =2, Grade III =3

Interpretation

References

External links 
 Online calculator based on Todd et al, 1987 study
 The Nottingham Prognostic Index Biomedical Informatics Research Group
 Nottingham prognostic index Ganfyd

Breast cancer